Tekeliören is a village in Tarsus)  district of Mersin Province, Turkey. Situated at   it is close to stateway . The population of Tekeliören  is 827  as of 2012.

References

Villages in Tarsus District